Eucalyptus camphora, commonly known as swamp gum is a flowering plant that is endemic to south-eastern Australia. It is a species of small to medium-sized tree with smooth bark, sometimes rough at the base, broadly lance-shaped to egg-shaped or elliptic adult leaves, flower buds in groups of seven, white flowers and conical fruit. There are two subspecies, subspecies camphora, commonly known as broad-leaved sally or swamp gum and subspecies humeana, commonly known as mountain swamp gum.

Description
It has smooth grey to brownish or almost black bark from the trunk to the thinnest branches, although sometimes with accumulated shed bark at the base. Flowering mainly occurs from January to April and the flowers are white.

Taxonomy and naming
Eucalyptus camphora was first formally described in 1899 by Richard Thomas Baker who published the description in the Proceedings of the Linnean Society of New South Wales. He had collected the type specimen "at Ganguddy Creek, Kelgoola, Rylstone, in 1895". The specific epithet (camphora) refers to camphor in the essential oil of the leaves.

In 1990, Lawrie Johnson and Ken Hill described three subspecies of E. camphora, two of which have been accepted by the Australian Plant Census:
The subspecies epithet (humeana) honours the explorer Hamilton Hume.

Eucalyptus camphora subsp. relicta and E. ovata var. camphora are synonyms of E. camphora subsp. camphora.

Distribution and habitat
Subspecies camphora grows in forest, often in marshy places and in valleys from south from Wallangarra in Queensland to near Glen Innes in New South Wales, then from near Rylstone to the Megalong Valley.
Subspecies humeana grows in similar habitats from Wee Jasper in New South Wales to the mountainous country east and north of Melbourne in Victoria.

References

camphora
Trees of Australia
Myrtales of Australia
Flora of Victoria (Australia)
Flora of New South Wales
Plants described in 1899
Taxa named by Richard Thomas Baker